Danilo Rafael Coito Pérez (born 23 October 1931) was a Uruguayan basketball player. He competed in the men's tournament at the 1960 Summer Olympics.

References

External links
 

1931 births
Year of death missing
Uruguayan men's basketball players
Olympic basketball players of Uruguay
Basketball players at the 1960 Summer Olympics
People from Florida Department